Aci Sant'Antonio is a comune (municipality) in the Metropolitan City of Catania in the Italian region of Sicily, located about  southeast of Palermo and about  northeast of Catania.  

The frazione of Santa Maria La Stella is home to an annual Presepe degli Antichi Mestiere, which is a presepe vivente or animated crib that is presented every Christmas by the parish and visited by many people from all over Sicily.

References

External links
 Official website

Cities and towns in Sicily